Brushy Branch is a stream in Audrain County in the U.S. state of Missouri. It is a tributary of Skull Lick Creek.

Brushy Branch was named for the brush along its course.

See also
List of rivers of Missouri

References

Rivers of Audrain County, Missouri
Rivers of Missouri